Adrián Carlos Marzo (born 24 January 1968) is an Argentine athlete who specialises in the hammer throw. His personal best in the event is 70.12 metres, set in 2000.

His eleven consecutive appearances at the Ibero-American Championships (between 1988 and 2008) are the record for this competition.

Competition record

References

1968 births
Living people
Argentine male hammer throwers
Sportspeople from Santa Fe, Argentina
Athletes (track and field) at the 1995 Pan American Games
Athletes (track and field) at the 1999 Pan American Games
Athletes (track and field) at the 2003 Pan American Games
Pan American Games competitors for Argentina
South American Games silver medalists for Argentina
South American Games bronze medalists for Argentina
South American Games medalists in athletics
Competitors at the 1994 South American Games
Argentine male shot putters